RockCorps is a pro-social marketing and entertainment company that uses music to inspire people to take action by volunteering and getting involved in their community.  RockCorps' principal idea is "Give, Get Given”. They do this by producing concerts with exclusive entry tied to participating in a 4 hour community volunteer project. To date, over 180,000 volunteers have attended more than 50 live concert events, giving over 700,000 hours to volunteering at more than 2,600 global charities.

The company was founded in 2003 and partnered in 2005 with Boost Mobile in the US. RockCorps has also partnered with brands such as Orange, and BT in the UK and France, Optus in Australia and Coca-Cola in South Africa. RockCorps' latest project is Apprentice Nation, which raises awareness of the apprenticeship scheme in the UK as an alternative route to university. It also provides young people with the skills they need to be successful in their early careers.

RockCorps has featured artists such as Rihanna, David Guetta, Lady Gaga, Drake, Pharrell Williams, Fifth Harmony, Kanye West, Ellie Goulding, 6LACK, Snoop Dogg, Maroon 5, and Vampire Weekend.

Some of RockCorps' latest projects include:

 Apprentice Nation, raising awareness of the apprenticeship scheme in the UK as an alternative route to university. It also provides young people with the skills they need to be successful in their early careers.
 What We Value: a Gen Z volunteering platform by Deutchse Telekom to support volunteering projects across Europe. 
 Bowl Up: This is a project created to celebrate family, music, food and cricket. It included a range of events across the UK in London, Nottingham, Leicester and Bradford with local communities and Cricket players taking part.

About 
Anyone who gives 4 hours of their time at a RockCorps organized volunteer event in their local community is given a ticket to an exclusive concert put on by RockCorps.

The volunteer events are always in partnership with local non-profit organizations. non-profit partners in various cities have included: Lee Valley Regional Park (UK), Thames 21(UK) Social Change Media (USA), Watts Boys and Girls Club (USA), Heal the Bay (USA), Big Kidz (USA), Reynoldstown Revitalization Corporation (USA), Arepa (FRANCE) and ABEJ (FRANCE).

RockCorps is not a non-profit organization, instead partners with a brand partner in each country, creating a marketing and communication platform that combines entertainment and community work. When launched in 2005 in the US, RockCorps partnered with Boost Mobile and was known as 'Boost Mobile RockCorps'. In the UK, France and Israel RockCorps is partnered with Orange and is known as 'Orange RockCorps'. In the UK in 2008 and 2009 RockCorps was also partnered with Sony Ericsson. This changed to BlackBerry in 2010.

History

RockCorps sprang from the work of the Greenbucks Foundation in the USA. Active in the mid-'90s, Greenbucks staged its initial concerts in Telluride and encouraged local residents to clean up the outdoor concert space in order to earn a ticket.

RockCorps' first nationwide effort in 2005 with partner Boost Mobile, a wireless telecommunications company. In its first year, the Boost Mobile RockCorps (BMRC) movement staged events in six U.S. cities and had 5,000 volunteers who generated 20,000 hours of service. In 2007, Boost Mobile RockCorps expanded the program to 11 cities and over 15,000 volunteers. BMRC had a total of over 30,000 American volunteers and travelled to over 13 U.S. cities.

RockCorps expanded to the UK in 2008, announcing in April its partnership with mobile operator Orange. In 2008, in partnership with Orange, Sony Ericsson and Channel 4, RockCorps produced the Orange RockCorps (ORC) concert at The Royal Albert Hall on September 26. To get a ticket to the show – people had to sign up for one of 55 volunteer events that happened throughout August and September. 5000 people volunteered 20,000 hours to 41 UK charities in London, Manchester, Cardiff, Southampton and Newcastle.

In 2009, Orange RockCorps returned to London, and also launched in Manchester, UK. The Manchester gig took place on July 13 at the Manchester Apollo with Lady Gaga, N-Dubz, The Enemy, V V Brown and Tinchy Stryder. The London concert took place on September 25 at the Royal Albert Hall with Nelly, Nas, Kelly Rowland and David Guetta, Razorlight, Chase & Status and Akon.

RockCorps also launched in Paris their first French program, on July 21 ("en association avec M6"). The concert took place on October 2 in Le Zénith and featured Akon, David Guetta, Busta Rhymes, Sefyu.

In 2010 Orange RockCorps spread to Israel for a Rihanna concert at the Bloomfield Stadium in Tel Aviv for 13,000 RockCorps volunteers.

2010 also saw Orange RockCorps return to Manchester and to the Apollo on July 8 with Snoop Dogg, Vampire Weekend, Tinie Tempah and Mr Hudson. The London concert that year was held in The Albert Hall on September 24 with Pendulum, Mark Ronson and the Business International featuring Boy George, N-Dubz, Taio Cruz and Plan B. By the end of 2010, 24,000 people had volunteered with RockCorps in the UK.

In France 2010, Orange RockCorps expanded to Marseille, completing the programme with a concert at Le Dôme on July 12 featuring Damian Marley, Nas, Sexion D'Assaut, Alonzo and Soprano. They also returned to Paris and with a concert at Le Zénith on October 5, featuring N*E*R*D, Sexion D'Assaut, Mark Ronson and the Business International featuring Boy George and V V Brown.

In Sydney 2013, Optus RockCorps launched their campaign with a 5,000 volunteer concert at the Hordern Pavilion with The Script, Tinie Tempah, Guy Sebastian, The Potbelleez.  In 2014 Optus RockCorps came to The Big Top in Luna Park Sydney which played host to 3,000 volunteers who came to see Empire of the Sun, Rudimental, Miguel, Samantha Jade.  Optus is still the sponsor of RockCorps in Australia.

RockCorps Japan launched in 2014 to help re-build communities affected by the 2011 Fukushima earthquake and tsunami.  RockCorps brought together 4,000 volunteers at the Tohoku Arena to see Ne-Yo, Kobukuro, Flumpool and May J.

The Concerts

Leadership

RockCorps continues to be operated by co-founders: Stephen Greene (CEO), film and TV director Chris Robinson. Original founders also included Grady Lee, Haley Moffett, Paul Hunter, Toby Garrett and Noel Eisenberg

The Collective

In 2009 RockCorps launched 'The Collective'. 'The Collective' is the anywhere/anytime part of the project. It rewards volunteers who give to their community, but who may not be able to make a project or gig. Volunteers have to give 4 hours of their time wherever, whenever they want and they become a part of 'The Collective community' by sharing their experience with their peers through The Collective website. Collective members are offered exclusive tickets and are entered into prize draws. Prizes have included Ticketmaster vouchers, tickets to RockCorps gigs in other countries, and exclusive access to other concerts.

References

External links
 
 Orange RockCorps France
 Optus RockCorps
 RockCorps Japan

Music organizations based in the United States
Volunteering
Musical advocacy groups